Dostál (feminine: Dostálová) is a Czech surname. Notable people include:

 Ferdinand Dostál (1861–1931), Czech lawyer who wrote under the name Otakar Bystřina 
 Frank Dostal (1945–2017), German musician
 Hana Dostalová (1890–1981), Czech illustrator
 Hermann Dostal (1874–1930), Austrian composer
 Josef Dostál (botanist) (1903–1999), Czech botanist
 Josef Dostál (canoeist) (born 1993), Czech canoeist
 Karel Dostal (1884–1966), Czech actor
 Karel Dostál (born 1961), Czech bobsledder
 Lukáš Dostál (born 2000), Czech ice hockey player
 Martin Dostál (born 1989), Czech footballer
 Nico Dostal (1895–1981), Austrian composer
 Ondrej Dostál (born 1971), Slovak politician
 Pavel Dostál (1943–2005), Czech theatre producer, writer and politician
 Roman Dostál (born 1970), Czech biathlete
 Stanislav Dostál (born 1991), Czech footballer
 Veronika Dostálová (born 1992), Czech volleyball player

See also
 
 
Dostal, İliç
15902 Dostál, a main belt asteroid

Czech-language surnames